Nathaniel Butcher (born 25 July 1997) is an Australian professional rugby league footballer who plays as a er and  for the Sydney Roosters in the NRL. He won an NRL premiership with the Roosters in 2019.

Background
Butcher was born in Sydney, New South Wales, Australia. He is the son of former Rabbitohs' player Blake Butcher.

Butcher played his junior rugby league for the South Eastern Seagulls, before being signed by the South Sydney Rabbitohs. Butcher is of New Zealand descent

Playing career

Early career
In November and December 2014, Butcher played for the Australian Schoolboys. After playing in the lower grades at the South Sydney Rabbitohs, he joined the Sydney Roosters in 2015. In 2015 and 2016, he played for the Roosters' NYC team.

2016
In round 26 of the 2016 NRL season, Butcher made his NRL debut for the Roosters against the Brisbane Broncos. In September, he was named at lock in the 2016 NYC Team of the Year. In October, he captained the Roosters' NYC team to a premiership win, defeating the Penrith Panthers 30-28 at ANZ Stadium.

2017
Butcher made 2 appearances for Easts in 2017 but did not feature for the club in their finals campaign.

2018
Butcher made 13 appearances for Eastern Suburbs in 2018 but made no appearances for the club in the finals and did not play in Easts 21-6 grand final victory over Melbourne.

2019
Butcher made a total of 23 appearances for the Sydney Roosters in the 2019 NRL season.  Butcher played from the bench in the club's 2019 NRL Grand Final victory over Canberra at ANZ Stadium.

On 7 October 2019, Butcher was named on the bench for the U23 Junior Australian side.

2020
Butcher played 19 games for the Sydney Roosters in the 2020 NRL season as the club reached the finals but were eliminated in the second week by Canberra ending their attempt of a third straight premiership.

2021
Butcher played a total of 19 games for the Sydney Roosters in the 2021 NRL season including the club's semi-final in week two.  The Sydney Roosters would be eliminated from the second week of the finals losing to Manly 42-6.

2022
In round 2 of the 2022 NRL season, Butcher scored two tries for the Sydney Roosters in a 26-12 victory over Manly.  In round 21, Butcher scored two tries in an upset victory over Brisbane.

In round 23 of the 2022 NRL season, Butcher scored four tries for the Sydney Roosters in a record 72-6 victory over West Tigers. This was the first time Butcher had scored four tries in a single game in his NRL career.  It was also the first time since 1951 that a forward had scored four tries in a game at the club.

References

External links

Sydney Roosters profile
Roosters profile
NRL profile

1997 births
Living people
Australian people of New Zealand descent
Australian rugby league players
Rugby league locks
Rugby league second-rows
Sydney Roosters players
Rugby league players from Sydney